The 2006 1. divisjon season (referred to as Adeccoligaen for sponsorship reasons) was a Norwegian second-tier football season. The season kicked off on April 9, 2006, with eleven rounds being played before the World Cup break on June 5. The league resumed on July 2 and the final round was played on November 5, 2006. 

Strømsgodset were promoted to the Tippeligaen as First Division winners, along with Aalesund who finished second. Strømsgodset will be playing in the top division for the first time since 2001. Aalesund, meanwhile, return to Tippeligaen after being relegated in 2005.

League table

Top goalscorers 

5 players scored 12 goals.

Relegated teams 

These two teams were relegated from the Tippeligaen in 2005. 12th-place finishers Molde defeated Moss in the playoff to retain their spot in the highest division.
Aalesund
Bodø/Glimt

Promoted teams 

These four teams were promoted from the 2. divisjon in 2005:
Haugesund
Manglerud Star
Sparta Sarpsborg
Tromsdalen

See also 
2006 Tippeligaen
2006 2. divisjon
2006 3. divisjon

External links 
Fixtures, results and table for Adeccoligaen 2006

Norwegian First Division seasons
2
Norway
Norway